The men's 20 kilometres walk at the 2015 World Championships in Athletics was held at the Beijing National Stadium on 23 August.

Summary
From the gun, the three Chinese athletes made it clear they were going to make an effort to take this home race.  The effort almost worked, as the group ultimately led by Olympic bronze medalist Wang Zhen held the lead until the bell.  At almost that moment, returning bronze medalist Miguel Ángel López had finally worked his way back to the lead.  The strain of leading showed on Wang's face as Lopez cruised past.  Lopez built upon that lead for the final lap and route back into the stadium.  Canadian Benjamin Thorne set the Canadian record on his way to the bronze medal in a national record time.

A deeper story might be in who was not here.  After years of the Viktor Chegin drug related cheating scandal, no Russian athlete entered the race, ending their dominance of world podiums. Recent world record setting Yusuke Suzuki also dropped out near the half way mark with a hip injury.  Andrés Chocho was making an effort to challenge the leaders late into the race, but instead was invited to leave the course with a red paddle.

Records
Prior to the competition, the records were as follows:

Qualification standards

Schedule

Results
The race was started at 08:30.

References

20 kilometres walk
Racewalking at the World Athletics Championships